The Generous Enemies; Or, The Ridiculous Lovers is a 1671 comedy play by the writer John Corye. It was first staged by the King's Company at the Theatre Royal, Drury Lane in London.

The original cast included William Wintershall as  Signior Robatzy, Edward Lydall as  Signior Cassidoro, Michael Mohun as Don Alvarez, Edward Kynaston as Signior Flaminio, William Cartwright as Don Bertran, Richard Bell as Sanco, Rebecca Marshall as Jaccinta, Elizabeth James as Alleria, Elizabeth Boutell as  Lysander and Katherine Corey as Julia.

References

Bibliography
 Van Lennep, W. The London Stage, 1660-1800: Volume One, 1660-1700. Southern Illinois University Press, 1960.

1671 plays
West End plays
Restoration comedy